The 2014 Basque Pelota World Championships were the 17th edition of the Basque Pelota World Championships organized by  the FIPV.

Participating nations

 (14)
 (3)
 (7)
 (3)
 (10)
 (4)
 (9)
 (4)
 (15)
 (3)
 (1)
 (14)
 (2)
 (4)
 (15)
 (11)
 (6)
 (13)

Events
A total of 15 events were disputed, in 4 playing areas.

Trinquete, 6 events disputed

Fronton (30 m), 4 events disputed

Fronton (36 m), 4 events disputed

Fronton (54 m), 1 event disputed

Medal table

References

World Championships,2014
2014 in sports
Sport in the State of Mexico
2014 in Mexican sports
International sports competitions hosted by Mexico
World Championships
World Championships